The Yaqui slider (Trachemys yaquia) is a  species of turtle belonging to the genus Trachemys of the family Emydidae. It is native to Chihuahua and Sonora in northwestern Mexico.

Subspecies 
No subspecies

References 

Bibliography

Trachemys
Turtles of North America
Endemic reptiles of Mexico
Fauna of the Sierra Madre Occidental
Natural history of Chihuahua (state)
Natural history of Sonora
Reptiles described in 1970